Jefferson Bispo Lacerda (born January 28, 1962) is a Brazilian sprint canoer who competed in the early 1990s. At the 1992 Summer Olympics in Barcelona, he was eliminated in the repechages of both the K-2 500 m event and the K-2 1000 m events.

Jefferson was instrumental in giving visibility to Ubaitaba's competitive canoeing and kayaking.

References

1962 births
Brazilian male canoeists
Canoeists at the 1992 Summer Olympics
Living people
Olympic canoeists of Brazil
20th-century Brazilian people